This is a complete list of ice hockey players who played for the National Hockey League (NHL) team Kansas City Scouts. It includes all fifty players who played for the Scouts. The Scouts never got into the playoffs while in Kansas City.

This list does not include data from the Colorado Rockies and the New Jersey Devils. The seasons column lists the season of the player's first game and the season of the player's last game.



Key

The "Seasons" column lists the first year of the season of the player's first game and the last year of the season of the player's last game. For example, a player who played one game in the 2000–2001 season would be listed as playing with the team from 2000–2001, regardless of what calendar year the game occurred within.

Skaters

Goaltenders

References

See also
List of NHL players

Kansas City Scouts players
players